The 2019–20 New Mexico Lobos women's basketball team will represent the University of New Mexico during the 2018–19 NCAA Division I women's basketball season. The Lobos are led by fourth year head coach Mike Bradbury. They play their home games at Dreamstyle Arena and are a member of the Mountain West Conference.

Previous season
They finished the previous season 24–7, 14–4 in Mountain West play to finish in second place. They lost in the  quarterfinals of the Mountain West Conference women's basketball tournament to San Diego State. They received an automatic bid to the Women's National Invitation Tournament where they got upset by Denver in the first round.

Roster

Schedule and results

|-
!colspan=9 style=| Exhibition

|-
!colspan=9 style=| Non-conference regular season

|-
!colspan=9 style=| Mountain West Women's Tournament

See also
2019-20 New Mexico Lobos men's basketball team

References

New Mexico
New Mexico Lobos women's basketball seasons
New Mexico Lobos women's basketball
New Mexico Lobos women's basketball